Sambara is a genus of moths in the family Tortricidae. The genus was erected by Leif Aarvik in 2004.

Species
Sambara sinuana Aarvik, 2004
Sambara sciara Razowski, 2012

References

Tortricidae genera
Olethreutinae